Song Wan is a fictional character in Water Margin, one of the Four Great Classical Novels in Chinese literature. Nicknamed "Giant in the Clouds", he ranks 82nd among the 108 Stars of Destiny and 46th among the 72 Earthly Fiends.

Background
When Liangshan Marsh is first mentioned in Water Margin, it is occupied by bandits led by Wang Lun, Du Qian and Song Wan. But Song apparently joins Liangshan after the band has been developed to a considerable size by Wang and Du. Song comes later with some men to add to its strength. Wang Lun takes the place of chief, with Du Qian placed second and Song third.

Lin Chong joins Liangshan
Song Wan, along with Wang Lun and Du Qian, is first mentioned when the nobleman Chai Jin suggests to the former imperial troops instructor Lin Chong, who has killed three men sent by Grand Marshal Gao Qiu to murder him in Cangzhou, that he could take refuge in Liangshan. However, when Lin Chong arrives at the stronghold, Wang Lun is worried that Lin, a good fighter, could usurp his place. So he tries to send him away with gifts and excuses. But Du Qian, Song Wan and Zhu Gui, who runs an outlying inn which acts as a lookout for Liangshan, pleads on Lin's behalf. Wang Lun eventually allows Lin Chong to stay but keeps him at a low position.

Chao Gai becomes chief
Later Chao Gai and his six robber friends, wanted for hijacking valuables in transportation to Grand Tutor Cai Jing in the imperial capital Dongjing, seek refuge in Liangshan. Again, Wang Lun fears that the group would pose a threat and tries to send them away with gifts and excuses. Wu Yong instigates the disgruntled Lin Chong to kill Wang. Du Qian, Song Wan and Zhu Gui are restrained by the others from interfering. Knowing that they are no match for the group, the three passively witness Wang being killed. They then transfer their loyalty to Chao, accepting him as Liangshan's chief. However, they are relegated to the last three positions.

Campaigns and death
Song Wan is appointed as one of the leaders of the Liangshan infantry after the 108 Stars of Destiny came together in what is called the Grand Assembly. He participates in the campaigns against the Liao invaders and rebel forces in Song territory following amnesty from Emperor Huizong for Liangshan.

In the battle of Runzhou (潤州; in present-day Zhenjiang, Jiangsu) in the campaign against Fang La, Song Wan fell from an arrow shot and was trampled to death by the enemy cavalry.  After the campaign ended, he is conferred the posthumous title "Righteous Gentleman of Integrity" (義節郎).

References
 
 
 
 
 
 
 

72 Earthly Fiends